The black-bellied bustard (Lissotis melanogaster), also known as the black-bellied korhaan, is an African ground-dwelling bird in the bustard family.

Description
The bill and legs are dull yellow. The male's upperparts have black and brown marks on a tawny buff background; the underparts are black. The head is boldly patterned with black, white and buff. The neck, long and thin for a bustard, is buffy brown with a thin black line down the front that joins the black breast. The tail is brown and buff with four or five narrow dark brown bands. The upper surface of the wings is white with a brown triangle at the base; the flight feathers have black tips except for the outer secondary feathers. The white of the wings is visible when the bird stands, contrasting with the black underparts.

The female is plain buff, cryptically marked with darker brown mottling on the back and vermiculation (narrow wavy bands) on the neck and breast. The juvenile is duller and darker, with a dark grey crown and buff spots on the wing.  The neck and rump patterns of both sexes, the male's white chin and lores, and the female's vermiculations are points that distinguish this species from its close relative, Hartlaub's bustard.

Range and habitat
It is found in savanna, cultivated fields and tall open grassland in sub-Saharan Africa. This species is also found in the areas of S. Africa, Zimbabwe, Botswana and some areas of Tanzania and Nigeria. It prefers higher rainfall than Hartlaub's bustard and in many areas occurs only following heavy rain.

Behaviour
In feeding habits it resembles other bustards.  In courtship display the male retracts his head to his back, giving "a short rising wheezy whistle, zhweeeeee", pauses in that position, and slowly raises his head, giving "a popping quock or plop followed by soft gurgling".

Diet
This is an omnivorous bird mainly feeding on invertebrates like beetles, grasshopper, cockroach, ants and some other small insects. Their diet also includes some vegetables, fruits like berries, flowers, seeds and green leaves.

References

External links
 Black-bellied korhaan - Species text in The Atlas of Southern African Birds

Lissotis
Birds of Sub-Saharan Africa
Birds described in 1835
Taxonomy articles created by Polbot